New Ottawa Arena is a planned indoor arena to be located in the LeBreton Flats district of Ottawa, Ontario, Canada. It will be the future home of the Ottawa Senators of the NHL and part of a mixed-use development slated for the area.

History
The Senators desired to move from suburban Kanata, Ontario, (up until 2001, an independent city west of Ottawa, now part of Ottawa) roughly 24 kilometres, to downtown. In Spring 2016, the Senators-backed RendezVous LeBreton Group was awarded the development rights to LeBreton Flats by the National Capital Commission.
In late 2018, partnership issues had developed between RendezVous LeBreton Group and Trinity Development Group, one of its partners. Finally, in December 2018, the National Capital Commission ended its agreement with RendezVous LeBreton Group allowing for a grace period if a settlement could be reached.

On June 23, 2022, the Senators-led Capital Sports Development Inc came to agreement with the National Capital Commission on a new plan with new partners for the development of the arena.

References

Proposed indoor arenas in Canada
Ottawa Senators